Seven Myths of the Spanish Conquest is a 2003 work by ethnohistorian Matthew Restall in which he posits that there are seven myths about the Spanish colonization of the Americas that have come to be widely believed to be true. Working within the tradition of New Philology, Restall questions several notions which he claims are widely held myths about how the Spanish achieved military and cultural hegemony in Hispanic America. The book grew from undergraduate lectures at Penn State University. The book has been published in  Spanish and Portuguese translations.

Chapters
Chapter 1 deals with what Restall calls "the Myth of exceptional men" — the idea that the Spanish Conquest was enabled by certain outstanding individuals such as Columbus, Cortés, and Pizarro and their personal courage and innovative strategies. Restall shows that instead, the techniques of conquest and colonization used by the early Spanish explorers had been developed throughout at least a century of colonial expansion by Spain and Portugal and were in fact mostly standard procedure. Restall draws on scholars' published work for this conclusion.  
Chapter 2 deals with what Restall calls "the Myth of the King's Army" — the belief that the Spanish conquest was undertaken at the behest of the King of Spain and that the conquistadors were Spanish soldiers. Restall claims that in fact the conquistadors did not necessarily see themselves as Spanish but rather viewed themselves as Andalusians, Castilians, Aragonese, Basques, Portuguese, Galicians, and even Genoese, Flemish, Greek, and Moorish. Nor were they acting under the command of the Holy Roman Emperor who was also the king of the Spanish realms. And they were not soldiers in a formal military sense of the word but rather a group of feudal lords with their respective footmen, servants, pages, and mercenaries.
Chapter 3 deals with what Restall calls "the Myth of the White Conquistador" — the belief that the Spanish conquest was accomplished by a small number of Spaniards. Restall claims that much of the actual military operations was undertaken by the indigenous allies of the Conquistadors (such as the Tlaxcalans), outnumbering the actual Spanish forces by many hundreds to one. He also shows that there were several conquistadors of African and Moorish descent — dispelling the idea of the conquest as a victory of the "white Europeans" over the "red Indians".
Chapter 4 deals with what Restall calls "the Myth of Completion" — the belief that all of the Americas were under Spanish control within a few years after the initial contact. Restall claims that contrary to this belief pockets of indigenous peoples living without having been conquered subsisted for several centuries after the conquest - and arguably to this day. For example, Tayasal, the last independent city of the Maya, did not fall under Spanish sway until 1697. In other areas of Hispanic America, Spanish control was never complete and rebellions were continuous. He shows that the colonization of the Americas did not happen as one fell swoop, but rather as a historical process starting centuries before the magic years of 1492 and 1521 and ending several centuries after.
Chapter 5 deals with what Restall calls "The Myth of (Mis)Communication" — the beliefs that the Spaniards and natives had perfect communication and that each group understood the other's words and intentions unhindered, or alternatively that many of the crucial events of the conquest were a result of the two groups misunderstanding each other's intentions. Restall claims how communication between the groups were in fact very difficult at first, and that the rendering of passages of speech made by one group to the other in post-conquest sources cannot be understood as having been recorded "verbatim" even though it is understood and interpreted that way. But he also shows that the natives cannot be said to have crucially misunderstood or misinterpreted the Spaniards' intentions, but rather that they had a good understanding of how the Spanish worked at a very early stage in the conquest.
Chapter 6 deals with what Restall calls "The Myth of Native Desolation" — the belief that the indigenous peoples of the Americas resigned to their fate, included themselves in the new European order and ceased to exist as ethnicities. He also argues that many of the indigenous peoples never felt "conquered" but rather that they had formed a partnership with a new power to both of their advantage - this for example was the case for most of the allied forces that helped Cortés defeat the Aztecs.
Chapter 7 deals with what Restall calls "The Myth of Superiority" — the belief that the success of the Spanish conquest was due to either the supposed technological superiority of the Spaniards or a kind of inherent cultural superiority — and that Spanish victory was therefore inevitable. Restall claims that such technological advantages as handguns, cannons, steel armor, horses, and dogs were not of great consequence in the actual fighting since they were all in short supply, and that the Aztecs were not daunted by this new technology for long. He also refutes the notion that the natives' lack of alphabetic writing constituted a major drawback. Nor were the natives childlike, naive or cowardly in comparison with the Spanish such as many early Spanish sources have painted them. Restall argues that the factors behind the success of the conquistadors were mostly the devastating effect of European diseases for which the natives had no resistance; the disunity between indigenous groups, some of which allied with the Spaniards early; the technological advantage of the steel sword; native battle practices that were not upheld by the Spaniards — such as killing non-combatants and civilians; and most importantly, the fact that the natives were fighting on their own ground with their families and fields to care for, which made them quicker to compromise.

Editions
Seven Myths of the Spanish Conquest was first published 2003 in cloth (hardcover) edition by OUP, with a paperback edition released the following year. A Spanish-language edition (under the title Los siete mitos de la conquista española) was published by Paidós, with imprints issued in Spain (Barcelona, November 2004) and Mexico (2005).

References

 
  
 
 }
 
 
 
 

2003 non-fiction books
21st-century history books
Mesoamerican studies books
History books about Spain
History books about the Americas
History books about the 16th  century